Herbert Lincoln Spencer (July 13, 1894 – January 29, 1960) was an American academic.  Spencer received his undergraduate degree from the Carnegie Institute of Technology (now Carnegie Mellon University) in Pittsburgh, Pennsylvania.  Afterwards, he received a master's degree in 1929 and his doctorate in 1933 from the University of Pittsburgh, where he later served as Dean.

Spencer was President of the Pennsylvania College for Women (now Chatham University) from 1935 to 1945.  After leaving PCW, he became the president of Bucknell University from 1945 to 1949.   Spencer was an archeologist with a known interest in photography. He was also the first man to receive an honorary Doctor of Laws degree from PCW in 1946.

References

External links
Inauguration of Herbert Lincoln Spencer, June twenty-third, nineteen forty-five By Bucknell University (1945)
 https://www.bucknell.edu/about-bucknell/president-bravman/presidents-of-bucknell

1894 births
1960 deaths
Presidents of Bucknell University
20th-century American academics